Belovo is a rural locality (a selo) and the administrative center of Belovsky Selsoviet, Rebrikhinsky District, Altai Krai, Russia. The population was 1,525 as of 2013. There are 31 streets.

Geography 
Belovo is located 19 km southwest of Rebrikha (the district's administrative centre) by road. Rebrikha is the nearest rural locality.

References 

Rural localities in Rebrikhinsky District